Samuel Nadeau (born July 7, 1982 in Colombes, France) is a French basketball player who played for French Pro A league clubs Limoges during 2003-2004 season and Vichy during 2004-2005 season.

References

French men's basketball players
French expatriate sportspeople in Spain
1982 births
Living people
Sportspeople from Colombes
21st-century French people